Rock music is a form of popular music that normally includes the electric guitar, bass guitar and drums.

Rock music may also refer to:

Rock Music (album), a 2003 album by the Superjesus
"Rock Music" (Pixies song), a song by Pixies on the 1990 album Bossanova (Pixies album)
"Rock Music" (Jefferson Starship song), a song by Jefferson Starship on the 1979 album Freedom at Point Zero
Rock Music: A Tribute to Weezer, a 2002 album by various artists

See also
Rock (disambiguation)